The National Museum of Peru is a national museum in Lurín District, Lima, Peru, located within the archaeological zone of Pachacamac. The museum will hold over a half million artifacts of the Pre-Columbian era and Inca Empire, ranging back to 5,000 BCE. It opened in July 2021 as part of Peru's bicentennial celebrations and is capable of accepting 15,000 guests per day.

History

Planning and construction 
Ideas for a national museum were first proposed by José de San Martín in 1822 when he proposed a national museum, library and archive to be constructed during the Peruvian War of Independence. The idea was promoted again nearly two centuries later by Minister of Culture Diana Álvarez Calderón during the administration of President Ollanta Humala in 2013. Humala had initial plans for a museum in Peruvian Amazonia, though Álvarez Calderón urged him to dedicate a national museum to Peru first, with ideas of creating a National Museum of Peru. In May 2014, bidding for the project's design was announced, with architect Alexia León Ángel winning the competition. 

The plan involved filling the new museum with pieces from the Museo de la Nación – the former Ministry of Fisheries headquarters from 1970 – and the National Museum of Archaeology, Anthropology and History of Peru, which was outdated and did not have proper equipment to maintain the temperature and lighting of displays. The process for safely transferring the items from other sites to the museum was anticipated to take about twenty years.

During the government of Francisco Sagasti, the Ministry of Culture announced in November 2020 that the museum was destined to open in July 2021 for the celebration of Peru's two-hundredth anniversary of independence.

Operation 

In late July 2021, MUNA opened to the public with a limited display in four galleries. One gallery featured information about the museum's background and construction while another highlighted how Peru's antiquities and culture were exploited by illicit trade. MUNA is expected to be fully operational in 2024.

See also 

 Pachacamac
 Southern Cone of Lima
 National Museum of Archaeology, Anthropology and History of Peru

References 

History of Peru
Inca Empire
Museums in Peru